The  (English: Palace of Santoña) is a palace located in Madrid, Spain. It was declared Bien de Interés Cultural in 1995.

The Candidates Tournament 2022 in chess was held at the Palacio from June–July 2022.

References 

Palaces in Madrid
Bien de Interés Cultural landmarks in Madrid
Buildings and structures in Cortes neighborhood, Madrid